The mangrove murex (Chicoreus capucinus) is a species of sea snail, a marine gastropod mollusk in the family Muricidae, the murex snails or rock snails.

Distribution and habitat
These sea snails are widespread in the Indo-Pacific, from Philippines and Australia (Northern Territory, Queensland, Western Australia) to Fiji and the Solomon Islands. They live in mangroves and mud flats.

Description
These large shells are heavy and solid, elaborately textured, uniformly dark brown, with six convex whorls. They are sculptured with prominent spiral cords, axial ribs and striae. The aperture is rounded or oviform, brown tinged and the inner labial edge show 14–17 denticles. The siphonal canal is quite long. The operculum is dark brown.

Biology
These voracious predators feed on the barnacles growing on mangroves and on mussels, snails and worms .

References

 Lamarck, J.B.P.A. de M. 1822. Histoire naturelle des Animaux sans Vertèbres. Paris : J.B. Lamarck Vol. 7 711 pp.
 Sowerby, G.B. (2nd) 1834. The Conchological illustrations, Murex. Pls 58–67; 1841: pls 187–199 and catalogue: 1–9. Sowerby, London.
 Adams, A. 1853. Descriptions of several new species of Murex, Rissoina, Planaxis, and Eulima from the Cummingian collection. Proceedings of the Zoological Society of London 1851(19): 267–272 
 Baker, F.C. 1891. Descriptions of new species of Muricidae, with remarks on the apices of certain forms. Proceedings of the Rochester Academy of Science 1: 129–137 
 Brazier, J. 1893. Catalogue of the marine shells of Australia and Tasmania. Part III. Gastropoda, Murex. Australian Museum Sydney, Catalogue 15:. 45–74 pp.
 Melvill, J.C. & Standen, R. 1899. Report on the marine Mollusca obtained during the first expedition of Prof. A.C. Haddon to the Torres Straits in 1888–89. Journal of the Linnean Society of London, Zoology 27: 150–206, pls 1–2
 Hedley, C. 1915. Studies on Australian Mollusca. Part XII. Proceedings of the Linnean Society of New South Wales 39: 695–755, pls 77–85 
 Cotton, B.C. 1956. Family Muricidae. Royal Society of South Australia, Malacological Section, Publication 8. 2 pls, 8 unnumbered 
 Wilson, B.R. & Gillett, K. 1971. Australian Shells: illustrating and describing 600 species of marine gastropods found in Australian waters. Sydney : Reed Books 168 pp. 
 Fair, R.H. 1976. The Murex Book: An illustrated catalogue of Recent Muricidae (Muricinae, Muricopsinae, Ocenebrinae). Honolulu : R. Fair 23 pls, 138 pp. 
 Houart, R. 1992. The genus Chicoreus and related genera (Gastropoda: Muricidae) in the Indo-West Pacific. Mémoires du Muséum National d'Histoire Naturelle. Paris A 154: 1–188 
 Wilson, B. 1994. Australian Marine Shells. Prosobranch Gastropods. Kallaroo, WA : Odyssey Publishing Vol. 2 370 pp. 
 Middelfart, P. 1997. An illustrated checklist of Muricidae (Gastropoda: Prosobranchia) from the Andaman Sea, Thailand. Phuket Marine Biological Center Special Publication 17(2): 349–388 
 Tan, K.S. & Chou, L.M. 2000. A Guide to Common Seashells of Singapore. Singapore : Singapore Science Centre 168 pp.

Bibliography
 Alan Hinton – Shells of New Guinea & Central Pacific
 Merle D., Garrigues B. & Pointier J.-P. (2011) Fossil and Recent Muricidae of the world. Part Muricinae. Hackenheim: Conchbooks. 648 pp.
 Ngoc-Thach Nguyên – Shells of Vietnam
  Petit, R. E. (2009). George Brettingham Sowerby, I, II & III: their conchological publications and molluscan taxa. Zootaxa. 2189: 1–218
 R. Houart – Chicoreus and related genera in Indo-West Pacific
 R. Tucker Abbott – Seashells of South East Asia

External links
 

Chicoreus
Gastropods described in 1822
Taxa named by Jean-Baptiste Lamarck